Al Fashir, Al-Fashir or El Fasher is the capital city of North Darfur, Sudan.
  
The town serves as an agricultural marketing point for the cereals and fruits grown in the surrounding region. Al-Fashir is linked by road with both Geneina and Umm Keddada. Al-Fashir had 264,734 residents , an increase from 2001, when the population was estimated to be 178,500.

Al Fashir University was created in 1990 by decree of President Omar Hassan Ahmed Bashir, and was officially opened in February 1991 in premises west of El Fasher Airport and south of the El Fashir School.

History 
Late in the 18th century, Sultan 'Abd al-Rahman al-Rashed of the Darfur Sultanate moved his itinerant court (fashir) to a site called Rahad Tendelti while campaigning in the region of northern Darfur as it was a superb spot for a settlement and grazing, eventually the site was renamed to Al-Fashir. A town developed around the sultan's palace grounds. It was one of the cities Amelia Earhart visited while attempting to circle the world.

Climate 
Al-Fashir has a hot arid climate (Köppen BWh) with three distinct seasons.

Economy
Due to the nearby Abu Shouk and Al Salam IDP camps with the influx of humanitarian aid from the United Nations as a result of the Darfur crisis, the city has experienced a significant economic and population boom. Rents and retail sales increased, including the selling of bottled water and the opening of a pizza parlor to cater to the demand from western aid workers. The number of gas stations has tripled in three years as a result of the increase in the amount of automobiles in the city. Employment opportunities also increased as the United Nations offered jobs to citizens. Economics analyst Adam Ahmed stated that the "people [of Al-Fashir] are beginning to think in a more business-minded way" to make the most of their situation.

See also 
 Chad – border country near Nyala, Sudan.
 History of Darfur

Notes

External links 
 Adventures of Sudan: Al-Fashir
 Historical weather for Al-Fashir

Fashir
State capitals in Sudan
Capitals of former nations
Fashir